Wayra Q'asa (Quechua wayra wind, q'asa mountain pass, "wind pass", Hispanicized spelling Huayrajasa) is a mountain in the Chunta mountain range in the Andes of Peru, about  high. It is located in the Huancavelica Region, Castrovirreyna Province,  Santa Ana District, and in the Huancavelica Province, Huachocolpa District.

References

Mountains of Huancavelica Region
Mountains of Peru